Cyphelium tigillare is a species of lignicolous (wood-dwelling) lichen in the family Caliciaceae, and the type species of the genus Cyphelium. Widespread in North America, it commonly grows on fenceposts.

References

Lichens described in 1798
Lichens of North America
Lichen species
Caliciales
Taxa named by Erik Acharius